Martin Speake (born 1958) is a British saxophonist. He teaches at Trinity Laban Conservatoire of Music and Dance in Greenwich, at the Royal Academy of Music and at the Guildhall School of Music and Drama. Speake has recorded eighteen albums as leader, including Change Of Heart with Paul Motian, Bobo Stenson and Mick Hutton.

Career
Speake studied classical saxophone at Trinity College of Music. He joined sax outfit Itchy Fingers and toured Europe, South America, Africa and the USA. In 1986, the band won the Schlitz Young Jazz Musicians of the Year Award, which also aired on the BBC.

In 2018, Speake appeared at London Jazz Festival at Cadogan Hall with Charukesi, his new project formed to reflect his interest in rhythmic music from around the world drawing from Arabic, Indian and Turkish influences.

Also in 2018, he released Intention on Ubuntu Music, in quartet with Ethan Iverson. The Jazz Mann reviewed the album in April 2018, rating it 3.5 out of 5.

Speake performed a concert at PizzaExpress Jazz Club, London which was subsequently broadcast on BBC Radio 3.

Amongst teaching positions that he holds, Speake is a visiting educator at London's Royal Academy of Music, and Guildhall School of Music and Drama.

Personal life
Speake LTCL is also a practicing nutritional therapist, and holds a BSc in Nutritional Medicine. He runs a practice in Abbey Wood.

Discography

As leader
 Quark with Itchy Fingers (Virgin, 1987)
 Teranga with Itchy Fingers (Pumpkin, 1988)
 In Our Time (Jazz Label, 1994)
 Amazing Grace (Spotlite, 1997)
 The Tan T Ien with Nikki Iles (FMR, 1998)
 Trust (33 Jazz, 1998)
 Secret with Nikki Iles (Basho, 2001)
 Exploring Standards (33 Jazz, 2003)
 The Journey (Black Box, 2004)
 My Ideal with Ethan Iverson (Basho, 2004)
 Charlie Parker (Jazzizit, 2005)
 Change of Heart (ECM, 2006)
 Hullabaloo (Linn, 2007)
 Spark with Mark Sanders (Pumpkin, 2007)
 Generations (Pumpkin, 2008)
 Live at Riverhouse (Pumpkin, 2009)
 Two Not One with Colin Oxley (Pumpkin, 2010)
 Bloor Street with Secret Quartet (Edition, 2010)
 Strong Tea with Pavillon (Pavillon, 2011)
 Always a First Time (Pumpkin, 2013)
  Sound Clouds with Douglas Finch (Pumpkin, 2013)
 The Quiet Mind (Pumpkin, 2014)
 Duos for Trio (Pumpkin, 2017)
 Zephyr with Faith Brackenbury (Pumpkin, 2017)
 Intention (Ubuntu Music, 2018)
 Feathers (Pumpkin, 2019)

As sideman
 Barry Green, Introducing Barry Green (Tentoten, 2006)
 Billy Jenkins, Entertainment USA (Babel, 1994)

References 

1958 births
Living people
Jazz alto saxophonists
FMR Records artists
ECM Records artists
Basho Records artists